Leon Berner (born 8 September 1935) is a former Australian rules footballer who played with Carlton in the Victorian Football League (VFL).

Notes

External links 

Leon Berner's profile at Blueseum

1935 births
Carlton Football Club players
Living people
Australian rules footballers from Victoria (Australia)